Mikhail Mikhaylovich Gerasimov (2 September 1907 – 21 July 1970) was a Soviet archaeologist and anthropologist who discovered the Mal'ta–Buret' culture and developed the first technique of forensic sculpture based on findings of anthropology, archaeology, paleontology, and forensic science. He studied the skulls and meticulously reconstructed the faces of more than 200 people, ranging from the earliest excavated homo sapiens and neanderthals, to the Middle Ages' monarchs and dignitaries, including emperor Timur (Tamerlane), Yaroslav the Wise, Ivan the Terrible, and Friedrich Schiller.

Early life

Gerasimov was born 1907 in St. Petersburg shortly before his doctor father was posted to settlement near Irkutsk. As a child he studied the bones of prehistoric animals that were unearthed during the construction of the area.

Gerasimov produced his first reconstructions of prehistoric Neanderthal and Java Man, in 1927 (Gerasimov, p. 5); they are exhibited in the Irkutsk museum. Gerasimov learned to take a skull of early hominids and, by dint of elaborate measurements and anatomical research, to form a face that people would recognize, sometimes including the most common expression. As he wrote in his autobiography, The Face Finder (1968), he was fascinated with an opportunity to "gaze on the faces of those long dead." It took a decade of studies and experiments to come close to individual portrait resolution quality of historical persons (1938, Gerasimov, p. 7), however his first public work of this type is dated 1930 – the face of Maria Dostoyevskaya, mother of Fyodor Dostoyevsky.

In 1928, Gerasimov studied in the archaeology department of the Irkutsk University where he studied under professor Bernhard Petri. He began to investigate Stone Age sites in Siberia such as Malta. In 1932 he moved to Leningrad for a graduate study. There he experimented with several skulls to find out if he could reconstruct faces of racial types. In 1937–1939, he reconstructed three faces from skulls of the Academy of Sciences of the Soviet Union — a Papuan, a Kazakh and a Khevsur Caucasian — and performed numerous forensic reconstructions for the NKVD. He received important public exposure by reconstructing the faces of Yaroslav I the Wise (1938) and Andrei Bogolyubsky (1939, dates referenced to Gerasimov, p. 185–186).

Faces of kings

In June 1941 Stalin sent Gerasimov to Uzbekistan with a team of archaeologists to open the tombs of Timur and other members of the Timurid dynasty. An apocryphal story from this time claims that Gerasimov's team opening Timur's tomb resulted in the German invasion of the Soviet Union. According to the story, Timur's memorial bore the warning “When I rise from the dead, the world shall tremble”, and when the sarcophagus was raised and opened on June 19, another inscription inside the casket read: “Whomsoever opens my tomb shall unleash an invader more terrible than I". Three days later, on June 22, Germany commenced Operation Barbarossa. Even though people close to Gerasimov claim that this story is a fabrication, the legend persists. During World War II, Gerasimov worked at the military hospital in Tashkent; hundreds of victims of the war provided him with important statistical data on human skulls of different races.

Gerasimov continued to hone his methods. In 1950, he received the USSR State Prize and the state established the Laboratory for Plastic Reconstruction (now in the Institute of Ethnology) where he continued his research. He also acquired a reputation as a man who charmed ladies by complimenting them on the shape of their lips.

In 1953 the Soviet Ministry of Culture decided to open the tomb of Ivan the Terrible and Gerasimov reconstructed his face. Afterwards he received an extra month's pay for the job. In 1961, Gerasimov travelled to Europe to help the Germans find the skull of the poet Schiller from the skulls in a mass grave.

He died in 1970 and was survived by four children.

Heritage
Gerasimov's method has spread across the globe and has been instrumental in reconstructions of what the pharaohs or, controversially, Jesus might have looked like. In 1991 Russian investigators also used the methods to clarify the identities of the remains of the family of the last Tsar.

Gerasimov's work is exhibited at:
 State Historical Museum, Moscow
 Anthropological museum of Moscow State University
 Museums of Georgia (skulls of Georgian origin, 1946)
 Museums of Uzbekistan (skulls of Timurid dynasty, 1941–1942)

Popular culture
 In popular culture (e.g., the film Day Watch), Gerasimov's exhumation of Tamerlane on 22 June 1941 is represented as the violation of an ancient curse which led to the outbreak of the German-Soviet War, whose turning point coincided with Gerasimov's eventual reburial of the ancient conqueror's skull. Gerasimov was also fictionalized as Professor Andreev in the detective novel Gorky Park.
 A 2022 Bengali novel Jagio Na Amay Jagio Na (Don't wake me up), by Himadri Kishor Dashgupta set on the story of exhumation of Tamerlane skeleton.

See also
 List of Russian artists
 Venus figurines of Mal'ta

References

 Gerasimov's 1949 book in Russian, listing 70 works from 1927 to 1947: Герасимов, М.М., Основы восстановления лица по черепу, "Советская наука", М., 1949

External links

 Eve Conant – Man of 1,000 Faces: The forensic genius of Mikhail Gerasimov (Archaeology magazine July/August 2003)
 Mikhail Gerasimov Career
Reconstruction of Appearance of Historical Personalities

Soviet archaeologists
1907 births
1970 deaths
Soviet inventors
20th-century Russian sculptors
20th-century Russian male artists
Russian male sculptors